Whoops! I'm a Cowboy! is a 1937 Fleischer Studios animated short film starring Betty Boop.

Synopsis
Betty's short weakling boyfriend Wiffle Piffle proposes to her. Betty turns him down, saying/singing she's only interested in a "bronco-busting" he-man cowboy. Wiffle sets off for a dude ranch to learn how to become a real cowboy. It doesn't work out so well.

Notes and comments
The film includes the first of only two appearances by Wiffle Piffle in the Betty Boop series. His second was in The Hot Air Salesman (1937). Otherwise, Wiffle Piffle appeared only in the Screen Songs series.

References

External links
 Whoops! I'm a Cowboy on Youtube.
 
 

1937 short films
Betty Boop cartoons
1930s American animated films
American black-and-white films
1937 animated films
Paramount Pictures short films
Fleischer Studios short films
Short films directed by Dave Fleischer
1930s English-language films
American animated short films
1930s Western (genre) comedy films
American Western (genre) comedy films